Prestik is a rubber-like temporary adhesive that is marketed in South Africa, and manufactured by Bostik. It is water resistant, and can be used in temperatures from -30°C to 100°C. It can be used to secure things in place, such as pieces of paper on walls or fridge doors. It is similar to Blu Tack.

External links
Bostik Prestik data sheet
Manufacturer's Website

Adhesives